Hampshire County is a historical and judicial county located in the U.S. state of Massachusetts. As of the 2020 census, the population was 162,308. Its most populous municipality is Amherst, its largest town in terms of landmass is Belchertown, and its traditional county seat is Northampton. The county is named after the county Hampshire, in England. Hampshire County is part of the Springfield, MA Metropolitan Statistical Area. Together with Hampden County, Hampshire County municipalities belong to the Pioneer Valley Planning Commission.

History

Hampshire County was constituted in 1662 from previously unorganized territory comprising the entire western part of Massachusetts Bay Colony. It included the original towns of Springfield, Northampton, and Hadley. The original Hampshire County also included territory that is now in modern-day Hampden County, Franklin County, and Berkshire County, as well as small parts of modern-day Worcester County. By 1683, three new towns (Westfield (now Southwick), Suffield, and Enfield) had been incorporated south of Springfield. These towns were partly or wholly in the modern state of Connecticut at the time of their incorporation and resulted in a border dispute between the Connecticut Colony and Massachusetts Bay Colony.

In 1731, Worcester County was created, which included the original town of Brookfield (incorporated in 1718 as part of Hampshire County). More territory was lost to Worcester County in 1742 when the town of Western (now Warren) was created and added to Worcester County. Further territorial losses occurred in 1749 when the towns of Enfield, Somers (split off from Enfield in 1734), and Suffield unilaterally joined Connecticut Colony. In 1761, Berkshire County was partitioned from Hampshire County. In 1811, Franklin County was split off from the northern part of Hampshire, and in the following year, Hampden County was split off from its southern part.

Following the dissolution of the county government in 1999, county affairs were managed by the Hampshire Council of Governments. The council itself ceased operations in 2019, due to what an appraisal of the council termed a "fundamentally flawed, unsustainable operational model"; it had no inherent source of income and lacked a regional planning function.

Politics

Geography

Hampshire County is the middle section of the Pioneer Valley, and the northern tip of the Hartford–Springfield Knowledge Corridor.

Adjacent counties
Hampshire County is the only county in Massachusetts surrounded in all directions by other counties of Massachusetts: all other counties in the state are adjacent to at least one other state or the open ocean.

 Franklin County (north)
 Worcester County (east)
 Hampden County (south)
 Berkshire County (west)

Demographics

2000 census
At the 2000 census there were 152,251 people, 55,991 households, and 33,818 families living in the county. There were 58,644 housing units at an average density of 111 per square mile (43/km2). The racial makeup of the county was 91.10% White, 1.96% Black or African American, 0.19% Native American, 3.40% Asian, 0.05% Pacific Islander, 1.50% from other races, and 1.80% from two or more races.  3.42% of the population were Hispanic or Latino of any race. 14.7% were of Irish, 12.8% Polish, 9.6% English, 9.5% French, 8.5% French Canadian, 6.9% Italian and 6.4% German ancestry, 88.8% spoke English, 3.4% Spanish, 1.7% French and 1.4% Polish as their first language.
Of the 55,991 households 28.20% had children under the age of 18 living with them, 47.40% were married couples living together, 9.80% had a female householder with no husband present, and 39.60% were non-families. 28.60% of households were one person and 10.20% were one person aged 65 or older.  The average household size was 2.39 and the average family size was 2.96.

The age distribution was 19.60% under the age of 18, 19.30% from 18 to 24, 26.80% from 25 to 44, 22.20% from 45 to 64, and 12.00% 65 or older.  The median age was 34 years. For every 100 females, there were 87.40 males.  For every 100 females age 18 and over, there were 83.90 males.

The median household income was $46,098 and the median family income  was $57,480. Males had a median income of $39,327 versus $30,362 for females. The per capita income for the county was $21,685.  About 5.10% of families and 9.40% of the population were below the poverty line, including 8.20% of those under age 18 and 6.70% of those age 65 or over.

2010 census
At the 2010 census, there were 158,080 people, 58,702 households, and 34,480 families living in the county. The racial makeup of the county was 88.7% white, 4.5% Asian, 2.5% black or African American, 0.2% American Indian, 1.5% from other races, and 2.5% from two or more races. Those of Hispanic or Latino origin made up 4.7% of the population. The largest ancestry groups were:

22.2% Irish
14.4% French
14.3% Polish
14.2% English
10.8% German
9.1% Italian
7.1% French Canadian
3.2% Scottish
2.6% American
2.3% Puerto Rican
2.3% Scotch-Irish
2.1% Russian
1.7% Chinese
1.5% Swedish
1.4% Portuguese
1.0% Lithuanian
1.0% Dutch 

Of the 58,702 households, 26.4% had children under the age of 18 living with them, 44.8% were married couples living together, 10.3% had a female householder with no husband present, 41.3% were non-families, and 29.7% of households were made up of individuals. The average household size was 2.34 and the average family size was 2.89. The median age was 36.6 years.

The median household income was $59,505 and the median family income  was $80,891. Males had a median income of $52,686 versus $43,219 for females. The per capita income for the county was $28,367. About 6.2% of families and 11.7% of the population were below the poverty line, including 11.8% of those under age 18 and 7.8% of those age 65 or over.

Demographic breakdown by town

Income

The ranking of unincorporated communities that are included on the list are reflective if the census designated locations and villages were included as cities or towns. Data is from the 2007–2011 American Community Survey 5-Year Estimates.

Education
Hampshire County is home to what are known as the "Five Colleges", which include the University of Massachusetts flagship campus and four well-known private colleges:

 Amherst College, Amherst
 Hampshire College, Amherst
 Mount Holyoke College, South Hadley
 Smith College, Northampton
 University of Massachusetts Amherst

The Five College Consortium provides course cross-registration between the schools and funds free bus service, provided by Pioneer Valley Transit Authority, between the campuses.

Communities

Cities
 Easthampton
 Northampton (historic county seat)

Towns

 Amherst
 Belchertown
 Chesterfield
 Cummington
 Goshen
 Granby
 Hadley
 Hatfield
 Huntington
 Middlefield
 Pelham
 Plainfield
 South Hadley
 Southampton
 Ware
 Westhampton
 Williamsburg
 Worthington

Census-designated places

Amherst Center
Belchertown
Granby
Hatfield
Huntington
North Amherst
South Amherst
Ware

Other unincorporated communities

 Cushman
 Florence
 Haydenville
 Leeds
 Mount Tom
 Ringville
 South Hadley Falls

Former towns
The following towns were disincorporated for the creation of the Quabbin Reservoir.
 Dana
 Enfield
 Greenwich
 Prescott

See also

 List of Massachusetts locations by per capita income
List of counties in Massachusetts
 National Register of Historic Places listings in Hampshire County, Massachusetts
 Registry of Deeds (Massachusetts)
 Tofu Curtain
 USS Hampshire County (LST-819)

References

General references 
 Wall & Gray (1871). Atlas of Massachusetts. Map of Massachusetts. USA. New England. Counties – Berkshire, Franklin, Hampshire and Hampden, Worcester, Middlesex, Essex and Norfolk, Boston – Suffolk,Plymouth, Bristol, Barnstable and Dukes (Cape Cod). Cities – Springfield, Worcester, Lowell, Lawrence, Haverhill, Newburyport, Salem, Lynn, Taunton, Fall River.   New Bedford. These 1871 maps of the Counties and Cities are useful to see the roads and  rail lines.
 Beers, D. G. (1872). Atlas of Essex County Map of Massachusetts Plate 5.  Click on the map for a very large image.

External links
 Hampshire County Sheriff's Office
 

 
1662 establishments in Massachusetts
1999 disestablishments in Massachusetts
Massachusetts counties
Populated places disestablished in 1999
Populated places established in 1662
Springfield metropolitan area, Massachusetts